Bridgend is a town in Wales.

Bridgend may also refer to:

England 
Bridgend, Cornwall
Bridgend, Cumbria, a location
Bridgend, Devon, a location
Bridgend, Gloucestershire, a location

Republic of Ireland
Bridgend, County Donegal

Scotland
Bridgend, Aberdeenshire, a location
Bridgend, Cairnbaan, Argyll and Bute, a location
Bridgend, Edzell, Angus, a location
Bridgend, Fife, a location
Bridgend, Glamis, Angus, a location
Bridgend, Inverclyde, a location
Bridgend, Islay, a village in Argyll and Bute
Bridgend, Kintyre, Argyll and Bute, a location
Bridgend, Kirriemuir, Angus, a location
Bridgend, North Lanarkshire, a location
Bridgend, Perth and Kinross, a suburb of Perth
Bridgend, West Lothian

Wales
Bridgend, a town in Wales
Bridgend (community), one of the three communities that make up the town of Bridgend
Bridgend (UK Parliament constituency)
Bridgend (Senedd constituency)
County Borough of Bridgend
Bridgend, Ceredigion, a location

Other
Bridgend (film), a 2015 film

See also 
 Bridge End (disambiguation)